The 1984 Leicester City Council election took place on 3 May 1983 to elect members of Leicester City Council in England. This was on the same day as other local elections.

Summary

References

Leicester
Leicester City Council elections
1980s in Leicestershire